UTC most often refers to Coordinated Universal Time.

It may also refer to:

Organizations and institutions
Unicode Technical Committee, a part of the Unicode Consortium
Union of Communist Youth in Romania
Union Treiziste Catalane (UTC), feeder club of Catalans Dragons, a French rugby league club based in Perpignan
Union Treiziste Catalane, the former name of the Catalans Dragons
United Technologies Corporation, a former conglomerate (nowadays Raytheon Technologies, Otis Worldwide and Carrier Global)
United Theological College (disambiguation)
United Transitional Cabinet, a government-in-exile for Belarus created in 2022
Universidad Técnica de Cajamarca, a Peruvian football club from Cajamarca
Université de Technologie de Compiègne, a French university and grande école
University Technical College, a type of publicly financed but independently run school in England for 14- to 19-year-old students
University of Tennessee at Chattanooga
Utah Technical College (UTC), the former name of Salt Lake Community College
Uttarakhand Transport Corporation, a state owned transport company in Uttarakhand, India
Washington Utilities and Transportation Commission

Places
 UTC, IATA code for Soesterberg Air Base in the Netherlands
 University Transportation Center
 Urban Transformation Centre, a public amenities centre in Malaysia
 Mall at University Town Center, Mall at UTC, a shopping mall located in Sarasota County, Florida, United States
 Westfield UTC, University Town Center, a shopping mall and transit hub in San Diego, California, United States
University City, San Diego, California, a neighborhood often referred to as 'UTC' because of the UTC mall

Other uses
Ultimate Typing Championship
Unified theory of cognition

See also
UCT (disambiguation)